Associazione Sportiva Roma did not manage to repeat its successful previous two seasons, and instead took a step back to seventh in the league championship. New coach Sven-Göran Eriksson was soon to get to grips with Italian football, with Roma improving the next year to be a force for the title.

Squad

Goalkeepers
  Franco Tancredi
  Astutillo Malgioglio

Defenders
  Dario Bonetti
  Settimio Lucci
  Aldo Maldera
  Sebastiano Nela
  Emidio Oddi
  Ubaldo Righetti

Midfielders
  Carlo Ancelotti
  Ruben Buriani
  Toninho Cerezo
  Odoacre Chierico
  Bruno Conti
  Antonio Di Carlo
  Falcão
  Giuseppe Giannini

Attackers
  Roberto Pruzzo
  Francesco Graziani
  Roberto Antonelli
  Maurizio Iorio

Competitions

Serie A

League table

Matches

Coppa Italia

Group stage

Results

Round of 16

European Cup Winners' Cup

First round

Second round

Quarter-finals

Statistics

Goalscorers
  Roberto Pruzzo 8 (3)
  Giuseppe Giannini 4
  Antonio Di Carlo 3
  Carlo Ancelotti 3

References

A.S. Roma seasons
Roma